The Charles and Grace Parker House is a house in the Lynnhurst neighborhood of Minneapolis, Minnesota southeast of Lake Harriet.  It was designed by notable local architects Purcell, Feick & Elmslie in the Prairie School style.  Architecture critic Larry Millett calls it one of Purcell and Elmslie's greatest houses, citing the broad gabled roof, the groupings of windows, the side porch, and the detail surrounding the entry.  The entrance includes a fretsawn arch and a frieze above the door, with beams and a pair of pendants on either side.  George Grant Elmslie designed the leaded glass windows. The house was listed on the National Register of Historic Places in 1992.

References

Houses completed in 1913
Houses in Minneapolis
Houses on the National Register of Historic Places in Minnesota
National Register of Historic Places in Minneapolis
Prairie School architecture in Minnesota
Purcell and Elmslie buildings
1913 establishments in Minnesota